Erethistes is a genus of South Asian river catfishes.

Species 
There are currently two recognized species in this genus:
 Erethistes maesotensis Kottelat, 1983
 Erethistes pusillus J. P. Müller & Troschel, 1849

Distribution
This genus is distributed in the Ganges and Brahmaputra drainages in northern India and Nepal, and east and south to the Salween drainage on the border of Myanmar and Thailand.

Description
Erethistes species lack a thoracic adhesive apparatus, a smooth to granulate anterior margin on a strong dorsal fin spine, a papillate upper lip, and 8–12 anal fin rays. The pectoral fin spine is serrated anteriorly and posteriorly. The anterior margin of the pectoral fin spine either has serrations all pointing toward tip of spine; arranged in divergent pairs; or outwardly directed and not divergent. The head is large and broad with a conical snout. The body is robust rather than slender as in some other erethistid genera, and is moderately short and flattened. All barbels are annulated with black rings.

References

Erethistidae
Fish of South Asia
Catfish genera
Freshwater fish genera
Taxa named by Johannes Peter Müller
Taxa named by Franz Hermann Troschel